The Canal Generating Plant is a petroleum and natural gas electrical power station in Sandwich, Massachusetts. Canal 1 a baseload unit began operation in 1968 and was for many years the most efficient oil burning plant in the US. Canal 2, a cycling unit began operation in the mid-1970s. The plant was bought by Mirant in 1999 (now GenOn Energy Holdings, part of NRG Energy).  It is located on and named after the Cape Cod Canal. Though today functioning only as a peaking plant, the Canal plant formerly generated the vast majority of the Cape's power in its heyday.

The plant's owner built a project to modernize the plant and keep it relevant by constructing a 330 megawatt simple cycle natural gas plant on the site which runs on natural gas unit and is capable of starting up within 10 minutes as well as a 1.5 MW solar array on the property. The third unit has the ability to run on #2 oil during cold periods in the winter when the natural gas pipelines are constrained. This project was reportedly chosen over repowering one of the oil units with natural gas.

In 2018 it was sold to private equity firm Ironclad Energy, subsidiary of Stonepeak Infrastructure Partners.

References

External links
Mirant plant's future on the line (October 2010)
Cape Cod Commission decision to permit storage of aqueous ammonia on site (February 2005)
EPA draft decision regarding discharge of cooling water into Cape Cod Canal (2009)

1968 establishments in Massachusetts
Buildings and structures in Sandwich, Massachusetts
Cape Cod Canal
Energy infrastructure completed in 1968
Natural gas-fired power stations in Massachusetts
Oil-fired power stations in Massachusetts